Philip Steffan Jones (born 9 February 1974) is a former professional cricketer who played for Somerset, Northamptonshire and Derbyshire County Cricket Clubs. He was a right-handed batsman and right-arm fast-medium pace bowler. He is now a teacher and occasionally a bowling coach.

Born in Llanelli, Carmarthenshire, Jones attended Ysgol y Strade in Llanelli, Loughborough University and Homerton College, Cambridge. He played for Cambridge University in 1997 and took 9–148 in the Varsity match that season. He made his first-class debut for Somerset later that season and spent seven years with them before having two unsuccessful seasons with Northamptonshire in 2004 and 2005. Playing for Derbyshire in 2006 Jones had much more success taking 59 wickets including a career best 6–25 against Glamorgan. He returned to Somerset for the 2007 season.

Although primarily a bowler he was also a useful lower-order batsman, with two first-class centuries to his name, both while playing for Somerset, scoring 105 against the New Zealanders in 1999, as well as 110 not out against Leicestershire in April 2007.

Jones joined Kent on loan for one month at the start of the 2009 season, subsequently returning to Somerset and then spending the end of the season with Derbyshire. After impressing by taking 30 wickets and scoring two half-centuries, he signed a two-year contract to remain with Derbyshire until 2011, taking on a coaching role in addition to his playing duties. He retired from cricket at the end of the 2011 season to take up a post at Wellington School, Somerset, where he is the head of Sports Performance and Wellbeing.

In March 2022, Steffan was contracted by Rajasthan Royals as their high performance fast bowling coach for the 2022 Indian Premier League season. He previously been the side's fast bowling coach in 2019.

References

External links

1974 births
Living people
Cricketers from Llanelli
People educated at Ysgol y Strade
Alumni of Loughborough University
Alumni of Homerton College, Cambridge
Somerset cricketers
Derbyshire cricketers
Northamptonshire cricketers
Cambridge University cricketers
Welsh cricketers
Dorset cricketers
Wales National County cricketers
Kent cricketers
British Universities cricketers